Country Gold is a 10-track compilation CD of songs taken from Nanci Griffith's MCA Records albums released by the label from 1986 to 1991: Lone Star State of Mind, Little Love Affairs, One Fair Summer Evening and Storms. It was released on March 11, 1997.

Track listing 
All tracks composed by Nanci Griffith except where indicated.
"Trouble in the Fields" 3:18
"Cold Hearts/Closed Minds" 2:40
"I Knew Love" (Roger Brown) 3:17
"Anyone Can Be Somebody's Fool" 2:39
"From a Distance" (Julie Gold) 4:10
"Never Mind" (Harlan Howard) 3:42
"Once in a Very Blue Moon" (live) (Patrick Alger, Eugene Levine) 2:16
"I Wish It Would Rain" 2:38
"Listen to the Radio" 3:45
"Drive-In Movies and Dashboard Lights" 3:14

References

1997 greatest hits albums
Albums produced by Glyn Johns
Albums produced by Tony Brown (record producer)
Nanci Griffith compilation albums
MCA Records compilation albums